Steele v. Louisville & Nashville Railway Co., 323 U.S. 192 (1944), is a United States Supreme Court case, concerning U.S. labor law, specifically, the responsibility of every formally recognized labor organization to equally represent all the members of their class or craft, under the Fair Labor Standards Act (FLSA). In particular, the Court ruled that the Act covered employees regardless of whether any particular individual(s) are, or are not, members of the duly recognized labor organization labor unions.

Background

From the beginning of railroading in the United States and elsewhere; the operation of motive power required the crewing of that power (the steam locomotive) with at least two individuals, each of whom had different and separate responsibilities.  The "Engineer" (or Engine-man) was responsible for the operation of the motive power and its attached train, in locomotion. over the railroad.  He caused his engine and train to move, accelerate/decelerate, reverse, or stop, based upon commands given him by the train's Conductor.  The Fireman provided the Engineer with a reliable continuous supply of the working fluid his engines needed to move the wheels.  The Fireman was responsible for igniting and maintaining the fire in the boiler's furnace; and, proactively maintaining the firing rate in the furnace and boiler, to give the Engineer the quantity and rate of steam necessary to meet the changing demands that arose from moving the locomotive and train at varying speeds and in accordance with any commands given to the Engineer.

The Fireman also had the concurrent responsibility to ensure safe operation in the firing and steaming processes of the locomotive's furnace and boiler, for efficiency, economy and safety of the train and crew.  Their lives at all times depended upon the Fireman's anticipation of the increases and decreases in the steaming rate the Engineer required of this locomotive.  All of this demanded a highly skilled and long experienced worker to serve as the Fireman in the cab of the oil or coal fired steam locomotive.  But beginning in the late 1920s and continuing to fulfillment in the 1950s- 1960s, an innovation of staggering proportions and impact began to be introduced on American rails.  It was the introduction of the diesel-electric locomotive.

The diesel-electric locomotive assaulted the primacy of the coal/oil fired steam locomotive from every angle.  First, it had a much higher duty cycle than any steam locomotive could match.  Famously, the use of steam locomotives to attempt the achievement of the schedules for the crack passenger trains between Chicago and the West Coast, required no less than nine (9) complete changes of engine and tender between Chicago and Los Angeles/San Francisco.  With no steam engine/tender set travelling more than 250 miles.  Diesels would complete these long distance runs with the same motive power units.  And the diesel units would only receive fuel and water at limited operating stops.  So the number of in-cab crews necessary to operate any schedule would be dramatically reduced by the introduction of diesels  

To this would also be added that there was simply no in-cab motive power operational role for the "Fireman" of a diesel locomotive.  The firemen had no engine-operation functions in the cab of a diesel locomotive. He had no functional responsibility to ignite, raise or lower, the power output of the diesel prime mover.  This was fully (electro-mechanically) automated, under the sole control of the locomotive Engineer, from the introduction of diesel prime movers in locomotive service.  It made all Fireman positions redundant when diesel motive power was planned.  This fact gave railroad management; and their labor union's leadership pause; in devising a strategy for the implementation of technical innovation known as dieselization.

The management of the L&N Railroad and the Operating Brotherhoods (unions) affected by management's decision for diesel locomotives met together and formulated a strategy to minimize the effect of change upon their members.  At the time the ritual of these Brotherhoods was to be segregated by race.  This segregation was at the time based upon the US Supreme Courts 1896 "separate-but-equal" doctrine that did not define a private organization's decision to be segregated by race; inherently discriminatory; by, and on the basis of race.  The Railroad Brotherhoods and Railroad management also pointed to the fact that they did not, and were not, in any way restricting the authority or responsibility of the L&N Railroad to hire or retain non-white or non-Union employees.

The strategy the Railroad and the Brotherhoods came up with was to reclassify all white Firemen who were Brothers in the affiliated Fireman's union, (recognized by both the Railroad Companies and the Government's Railway Labor Board), to be Assistant Engineers in the Brotherhood of Locomotive Engineers' union.  Second, as Assistant Engineers these men (all white) would begin their apprenticeship training to become full Engineers.  And as diesel locomotives were introduced, the Assistant Engineers would be assigned to them as engineers as positions came open, and as they qualified as Engineers on the diesel locomotives.

For the Black Firemen, the decisions by the Companies and the Unions could not have been more different.  First, NO Black Firemen would or could be transferred from the job classification of Fireman to the classification of Assistant Engineer in the Brotherhood of Locomotive Engineers. Second the existing Fireman's seniority (which was not segregated by race between Black and white Fireman) roster would be abolished and re-ordered.  This was made necessary by the further decision that since only white Fireman could move from the roster of Fireman to Assistant Engineer; there needed to be separate and segregated reordering of the Firemen's seniority (exclusively made up of the white Firemen); to fairly move (by the white's only Fireman's seniority) the white Firemen, to the ranks of Assistant Engineers in the Brotherhood of Locomotive Engineers.

Lastly, all of this was done without either notice or discussions with the Black Fireman.  Black Fireman were only advised after the Unions and the L&N Railroad had reached their agreement.  And the Railroad published a revised seniority roster that it would use in scheduling employees for work, and the Black Firemen noticed that their schedules all reflected that they were being assigned work, as if they had no seniority at all.

Facts
Steele was an employee in Alabama of the Louisville & Nashville Railroad Co, and was not a member of the Brotherhood of Locomotive Firemen and Enginemen, a majority white union. The union, without notifying any of the black employees, including Steele, gave the employer a notice that it wished to amend the collective agreement to exclude black staff members, that white firemen only should be promoted and assigned to permanent jobs. The eventual agreement was no more than 50% of firemen staff should be black. Mr Steele, who had worked in a desirable 'passenger pool' job, lost his position and was forced to shift to a worse job. He petitioned for breach of statutory duty, for the union not representing black employees, simply because of their race.
Supreme Court of Alabama held there was no violation, because the Act did not require expressly any regard for the specific interests of minorities.

Judgment
The Supreme Court held that under the Railway Labor Act, as an exclusive bargaining representative a union was obliged to represent all employees without discrimination, in the same way the Constitution requires equal protection by the legislature of every citizen. There is a duty to represent minorities, by considering their requests and views, and give notice of and opportunity for hearing about its actions.

Chief Justice Stone gave the court's judgment.

See also

 Tunstall v. Brotherhood of Locomotive Firemen and Enginemen: A similar case decided the same day.
United States labor law

References

External links
 

United States labor case law
United States Supreme Court cases
United States Supreme Court cases of the Stone Court
1944 in United States case law
Railway litigation in 1944
Louisville and Nashville Railroad
United Transportation Union
United States racial discrimination case law